John Vincent Fuller (born 1965) is a United States Navy vice admiral who serves as the 42nd Naval Inspector General since June 11, 2021. Prior to that, Fuller served as deputy director for force protection of the Joint Staff and before that as the director of strategy, plans, and policy of the United States Northern Command.

As the deputy director for force protection (DDFP), Fuller led three force protection divisions which include the Joint Integrated Air and Missile Defense Organization (JIAMDO) that is responsible for the advocacy and integration of Joint IAMD capabilities; Force Protection Division which identifies and develops joint requirements for asset and personnel protection; and serves as director, Joint Requirements Office for Chemical, Biological, Radiological, and Nuclear Defense (JRO-CBRND), a Chairman's Controlled Activity (CCA). Fuller also serves as the chairman of the protection Functional Capabilities Board.

Education
He received his commission from the U.S. Naval Academy in 1987. He earned a Bachelor of Science in political science from the Naval Academy and a Master of Science in management from the Naval Post Graduate School. He also earned a Master of Arts in national security and strategic studies from the College of Naval Command and Staff at the Naval War College. He is a Massachusetts Institute of Technology Seminar XXI Fellow.

Military career
Fuller's sea duty tours include damage control assistant, combat information center officer and assistant engineering officer,  (FFG-48); chief engineer,  (FFG-59); Atlantic Fleet Propulsion Examining Board; flag secretary, Amphibious Force, U.S. 7th Fleet; executive officer aboard  (DDG-54); commanding officer,  (DDG-87); deputy commander, Destroyer Squadron 22; commander, Task Group-Iraqi Maritime; and commander, Destroyer Squadron 22.

Ashore, he served in numerous joint and staff billets to include, Plans & Policy/Community Issues Section head and Strategy & Alignment Branch head, Surface Warfare Division; U.S. Naval Academy 4th Battalion Officer; military assistant to the director, rapid fielding in the Office of the Secretary of Defense (AT&L); special assistant to the Littoral Combat Ship (LCS)/Joint High Speed Vessel Council chairman, Navy Staff; operational definition team lead for the Small Surface Combatant Task Force; and deputy for LCS, Surface Warfare Division.

As a flag officer, he first served as commander of Navy Region Hawaii and Naval Surface Group, Middle Pacific.

Fuller assumed command of Carrier Strike Group 1 on July 18, 2017. He held that position until 2018 when he was replaced by Rear Admiral Alvin Holsey. He then served as the director of Strategy, policy & plans (J5), North American Aerospace Defense Command and U.S. Northern Command at Peterson Air Force Base, Colorado. Since August 27, 2020, he has served as the deputy director for force protection of the Joint Staff.

In April 2021, Fuller was nominated for promotion to vice admiral and assigned to replace Vice Admiral Richard P. Snyder as the Naval Inspector General. His nomination was confirmed by the United States Senate on April 29. He assumed the position on June 11, 2021.

Personal life

As a senior, Fuller played defensive back for the 1986 Navy Midshipmen football team.

References 

1965 births
Navy Midshipmen football players
Living people
Place of birth missing (living people)
United States Naval Academy alumni
Naval Postgraduate School alumni
College of Naval Command and Staff alumni
Recipients of the Meritorious Service Medal (United States)
Recipients of the Legion of Merit
United States Navy admirals
Recipients of the Defense Superior Service Medal
United States Navy Inspectors General